Richard Lund Jowett (born 29 April 1937) is a former first-class cricketer who played for Oxford University from 1957 to 1960.

Richard Jowett was educated at Bradford Grammar School before going up to Magdalen College, Oxford. An aggressive middle-order batsman and off-spin bowler, he was a regular member of the Oxford cricket team for three years from 1957 to 1959, and played two further games in 1960. He was club secretary in 1959.

In his fourth first-class match for Oxford he scored 105 and 30 not out and took 3 for 50 and 3 for 34 against Free Foresters. Later that season, in a first-class match against D. R. Jardine's XI, he scored 122 in the second innings in a match in which no one else reached 50. Oxford won both matches. He played a few matches for Yorkshire Second XI later that season.

After graduating he worked as an orthopaedist in Bournemouth.

References

External links

1937 births
Living people
People from Rawdon, West Yorkshire
People educated at Bradford Grammar School
Alumni of Magdalen College, Oxford
English cricketers
Oxford University cricketers